AC Nagano Parceiro (AC長野パルセイロ, E Shī Nagano Paruseiro) is a Japanese football club based in Nagano, capital of Nagano Prefecture. They play in the J3 League, Japanese third tier of professional football.

Name origin 
The club name parceiro means "partner" in Portuguese.

History 
The history of the club dates back to 1990 when a group of local high school graduates started a football club Nagano Elza SC. The team colors, orange and dark blue, represent Nagano Prefecture, and the team logo uses a lioness named Elza. In 2007, the club changed the name to AC Nagano Parceiro because the name "Elza" had already been trademarked. However, the club decided to keep the team colors and logo.

In 2011, the team's first season in the JFL, they finished in the second place, but the team was not qualified to for J2 League. J. League Associate Membership status was not granted because the capacity of their stadium did not satisfy the league's requirement (minimum 10,000 seats).

In 2014, the team became the member of the newly founded J3 league, and later acquired the J. League Associate Membership in September as their stadium capacity met the required minimum number of seats.

Rivalries 
The main rival of the club is neighboring Matsumoto Yamaga FC, the matches between them are called the "Shinshū derby".

League and cup record 

Key

Honours 
Japan Football League/J3 League
Champions: 2013
Runners-up: 2011, 2012, 2014
Shakaijin Cup:
Winners: 2008
Runners-up: 2010
Hokushin'etsu Soccer
Winners 2002, 2005, 2008, 2010

Current squad 

As of 31 January 2023.

Out on loan

Coaching Staff 
For the 2023 season.

Kit evolution

Managerial history

References

External links 
Official Site (in Japanese)
2014 Squad

 
Football clubs in Japan
Association football clubs established in 1990
Sport in Nagano (city)
Sports teams in Nagano Prefecture
1990 establishments in Japan
Japan Football League clubs
J.League clubs